The 2020–21 Oregon Ducks women's basketball team represented the University of Oregon during the 2020–21 NCAA Division I women's basketball season. The Ducks, led by seventh-year head coach Kelly Graves, played home games at the Matthew Knight Arena as members of the Pac-12 Conference.

Previous season 

The Ducks finished the season 31–2, 17–1 in Pac-12 play to finish in first place. They won the Pac-12 women's tournament, defeating Utah, Arizona, and Stanford along the way to their title.  The NCAA tournament and WNIT were cancelled due to the COVID-19 outbreak.  Oregon finished ranked second in both the AP and Coaches poll.

Offseason

Departures

Incoming transfers

Recruiting class of 2020

Roster

Schedule

Source:

|-
!colspan=6 style=| Regular Season

|-
!colspan=6 style=|Pac-12 Women's Tournament

|-
!colspan=6 style=|NCAA Women's Tournament

Rankings 

^Coaches did not release a Week 2 poll.  The AP Poll does not release a poll after the NCAA Tournament.

See also
 2020–21 Oregon Ducks men's basketball team

References

Oregon Ducks women's basketball seasons
Oregon
Oregon Ducks
Oregon Ducks
Oregon